A live band dance is an event where the means of serving the dancefloor involves the use of a live band.

History
Before the rise of discothèques and DJ-based dancefloors with recorded music (prior to the 1950s); live bands were the ubiquitous means of serving the dancefloor.  Along with that, slow-dancing was the primary method of dancing at the time.  However; the rise of Rock and Roll music initially made it hard for people to dance when it was popularized in the early 1950s, however people quickly adapted to it and started dancing at higher speeds almost coinciding the rise of DJ-based dancefloors.  Live bands have quickly been displaced by DJ-based dancefloors as the DJ stands took up less space than bandstands and that it played recorded music.

Modern comeback
Live band dances are still used on occasion at ballrooms.  Along with that, moshpits have live punk rock bands, so people are able to hear the hardcore sound  associated with moshing.  Some formal dances such as proms use live bands as a means of serving the dancefloor.  Also, some people choose live bands because they believe there are virtually no space constraints for the band's instruments.  Dance parties with high-end formality have also preferred live bands as means of serving the dancefloor.

In popular culture
In Back to the Future; which took place in the 1950s; Jazz music was being played as it was the ubiquitous genre for live band based dancefloors prior to the time period the movie took place at.  However, when Marty comes up to stand in the position of the guy with the hurt hand, he eventually plays the song "Johnny B. Goode"; but then sees the hardship of compensation of the song and ends up saying "I can't guess you guys are ready for that, but your kids are gonna love it'; which references the aforementioned rapid transition to Rock and Roll as a dance genre.
In Idle Hands; a live band is used for a dancefloor with fans of punk music.

See also
Ballroom
Concert
Dance bar

References 

Live music
Dance music